The 2012 Coppa Italia Final was the final match of the 2011–12 Coppa Italia, the 65th season of the top cup competition in Italian football. The match was played at the Stadio Olimpico in Rome on Sunday, 20 May 2012 between Juventus and Napoli. Napoli won the match 2–0, with Edinson Cavani and Marek Hamšík scoring. The cup victory was Napoli's fourth in the competition. The two teams also later faced each other in the 2012 Supercoppa Italiana, as Napoli were cup champions and Juventus were crowned 2012 Serie A Champions.

Road to the final

Match

Details

References 

Coppa Italia Finals
Coppa Italia Final
Coppa Italia Final 2012
Coppa Italia Final 2012